Batson is a patronymic surname, derived from Bartholomew.  It may refer to:

 Benjamin Batson (1942-1996), American academic and historian 
 Brendon Batson, English soccer player 
 Cameron Batson (born 1995), American football player
 Daniel Batson, American social psychologist 
 Felix Ives Batson (1819-1871), American lawyer and politician 
 Henrietta Batson (1859-1943), English writer
 Mark Batson, American record producer and songwriter 
 Matthew Arlington Batson (1866-1917), United States Army officer  
 Nadia Batson, female  soca singer of Trinidad and Tobago              
 Nathan Batson, English cricket player                             
 Ruth Batson (1921-2003), American civil rights and education activist 
 Susan Batson, American actress, author, and producer; daughter of Ruth Batson

Fictional characters
 Billy Batson the alter ego of Captain Marvel

See also
 Batson, Texas 
 Batson venous plexus, feature of human pelvic anatomy 
 Batson v. Kentucky (1986), United States Supreme Court case 
 Alexander Edmund Batson Davie (1847-1889), Canadian lawyer and politician

English-language surnames
Patronymic surnames